

2010 Final results  

 2010 Progress

2011 Final results  

 2011 Progress

2012 Final results  

 2012 Progress

2013 Final results  

 2013 Progress

2014 Final results  

 2014 Progress

2015 Final results  

 2015 Progress

2016 Final results  

 2016 Progress

2017 Final results  

 2017 Progress

2018 Final results  

 2018 Progress

2019 Final results  

 2019 Progress

Further results
For further results see:
 Soling North American Championship results (1969–79)
 Soling North American Championship results (1980–89)
 Soling North American Championship results (1990–99)
 Soling North American Championship results (1990–99)
 Soling North American Championship results (2000–09)
 Soling North American Championship results (2010–19)
 Soling North American Championship results (2020–29)

References

Soling North American Championship